Stefania Biegun (11 August 1935 – 10 December 2016) was a Polish cross-country skier. She competed at the 1960, 1964 and the 1968 Winter Olympics.

Cross-country skiing results

Olympic Games

World Championships

References

External links
 

1935 births
2016 deaths
Polish female cross-country skiers
Olympic cross-country skiers of Poland
Cross-country skiers at the 1960 Winter Olympics
Cross-country skiers at the 1964 Winter Olympics
Cross-country skiers at the 1968 Winter Olympics
People from Żywiec County